The Renault KZ is a mid-size car or large family car manufactured by Renault from 1923 until 1931.

Details and Evolutions
The KZ was the replacement of the Type GS and the Type IG and its intention was to be a rival of the Citroen Type C in the class called "populaires" (economic). The car had a 4-cylinder engine of 2120 cc, 33 cm larger than its predecessors.

In 1927 three new models arrived, the KZ1, KZ2, KZ3, 21 cm larger.

In 1929 and 1931 the KZ4 and KZ5 were introduced.

The KZ11, was a taxis G7 company, a special series of 2400 vehicles with new adaptations.

Types

KZ
KZ1
KZ2
KZ3
KZ4
KZ5

Specification

Speed = 75 km/h

KZ
Cars introduced in 1923
1930s cars